Collostructional analysis is a family of methods developed by (in alphabetical order) Stefan Th. Gries (University of California, Santa Barbara) and Anatol Stefanowitsch (Free University of Berlin). Collostructional analysis aims at measuring the degree of attraction or repulsion that words exhibit to constructions, where the notion of construction has so far been that of Goldberg's construction grammar.

Collostructional methods
Collostructional analysis so far comprises three different methods:

 collexeme analysis, to measure the degree of attraction/repulsion of a lemma to a slot in one particular construction;
 distinctive collexeme analysis, to measure the preference of a lemma to one particular construction over another, functionally similar construction; multiple distinctive collexeme analysis extends this approach to more than two alternative constructions;
 covarying collexeme analysis, to measure the degree of attraction of lemmas in one slot of a construction to lemmas in another slot of the same construction.

Input frequencies
Collostructional analysis requires frequencies of words and constructions and is similar to a wide variety of collocation statistics. It differs from raw frequency counts by providing not only observed co-occurrence frequencies of words and constructions, but also

(i) a comparison of the observed frequency to the one expected by chance; thus, collostructional analysis can distinguish attraction and repulsion of words and constructions;

(ii) a measure of the strength of the attraction or repulsion; this is usually the log-transformed p-value of a Fisher-Yates exact test.

Versus other collocation statistics
Collostructional analysis differs from most collocation statistics such that

(i) it measures not the association of words to words, but of words to syntactic patterns or constructions; thus, it takes syntactic structure more seriously than most collocation-based analyses;

(ii) it has so far only used the most precise statistics, namely the Fisher-Yates exact test based on the hypergeometric distribution; thus, unlike t-scores, z-scores, chi-square tests etc., the analysis is not based on, and does not violate, any distributional assumptions.

See also
 Collocation extraction

References

General references
 Gries, Stefan Th. & Anatol Stefanowitsch. 2004a. Extending collostructional analysis: A corpus-based perspectives on 'alternations'. International Journal of Corpus Linguistics 9.1:97-129.
 Gries, Stefan Th. & Anatol Stefanowitsch. 2004b. Co-varying collexemes in the into-causative. In: Achard, Michel & Suzanne Kemmer (eds.). Language, Culture, and Mind. Stanford, CA: CSLI, p. 225-36.
 Gries, Stefan Th. & Anatol Stefanowitsch. 2011. Cluster analysis and the identification of collexeme classes. In: Newman, John & Sally Rice (eds.). Empirical and Experimental Methods in Cognitive/Functional Research. Stanford, CA: CSLI. 
 Stefanowitsch, Anatol & Stefan Th. Gries. 2003. Collostructions: Investigating the interaction between words and constructions. International Journal of Corpus Linguistics 8.2:209-43.
 Stefanowitsch, Anatol & Stefan Th. Gries. 2005. Co-varying collexemes. Corpus Linguistics and Linguistic Theory 1.1:1-43.
 Stefanowitsch, Anatol. 2006. Negative evidence and the raw frequency fallacy. Corpus Linguistics and Linguistic Theory 2.1:61-77.

Applications
 Gries, Stefan Th. 2005. Syntactic priming: A corpus-based approach. Journal of Psycholinguistic Research 34.4:365-99.
 Gries, Stefan Th. & Stefanie Wulff. 2005. Do foreign language learners also have constructions? Evidence from priming, sorting, and corpora. Annual Review of Cognitive Linguistics 3:182-200.
 Hilpert, Martin. 2006. Distinctive collexeme analysis and diachrony. Corpus Linguistics and Linguistic Theory 2.2:243-57.
 Jensen, Kim Ebensgaard. 2012. Fatal attraction: inheritance and collostruction in the ihjel-construction. Skandinaviske Sprogstudier 3.2:1-30.
 Stefanowitsch, Anatol. 2005. The function of metaphor: developing a corpus-based perspective. International Journal of Corpus Linguistics 10.2: 161–198.
 Wiechmann, Daniel. 2008. Sense-contingent lexical preferences and early parsing decisions [...]. Cognitive Linguistics 19.3: 439–455.

Papers that document its predictive superiority over raw frequency counts
 Gries, Stefan Th., Beate Hampe, & Doris Schönefeld. 2005. Converging evidence: [...]. Cognitive Linguistics 16.4:635-76.
 Gries, Stefan Th., Beate Hampe, & Doris Schönefeld. to appear. Converging evidence II: [...]. In: Newman, John & Sally Rice (eds.). Experimental and Empirical Methods in Cognitive/Functional Research. Stanford, CA: CSLI. (working title)
 Wiechmann, Daniel. 2008. On the Computation of Collostruction Strength: [...]. Corpus Linguistics and Linguistic Theory 4.2: 253–290.

Natural language parsing
Methods in linguistics
Statistical natural language processing